Karutha Sooryan is a 2017 Malayalam language film produced by  E.V.M. Ali and Dileep Kunnachi under the banner of The Kingstar productions. The film stars Muhammad Shah, Rishad, Residh Bose and Manjusha in the lead roles along with Kalabhavan Abi, Neena Kurup and Kochupreman. The film's story, screenplay and direction is done by E V M Ali. This film was the last movie of Kalabhavan Abi, a mimicry artist who performed comical roles in older Malayalam films.

Plot 
A blind boy, Gopu, rejected by his father is looked after by his mother and is taught music by a local musician. He is in love with a girl living nearby and they spend their free time together. Later, being mocked by villagers for his deformity, he leaves the village leaving his love behind. There he is taken care of by a boy named Vishnu, who finds him on the roadside. Though Vishnu's parents were not that interested, they still accept Gopu. Vishnu and Gopu grow up together and become like family. Vishnu is a person who has the ability to foresee future events in his dreams as most of his dreams have come true. He foresees his death and makes arrangements to donate his eyes to Gopu. Vishnu had a quarrel with a colleague named Deenu in the college and Deenu has already fixed a quotation with a gang from Bombay to murder Vishnu. Later, Vishnu is killed by the gang in an accident. Gopu receives Vishnu's donated eyes. When Gopu learns about Vishnu's murderer, he and his friends try to murder him. Later, it is revealed that the real murderer of Deenu was Vishnu's father, Rajashekaran Thambi and he himself is the father of Gopu.

Cast 

Kalabhavan Abi        
Shivaji Guruvayoor
Neena Kurup        
Kochu Preman
 Muhammad Shah
 Rishad
 Residh Bose
 Kochupreman
 Manjusha
 Megha
 Priyanka Nayar
 Razaq Paradise
 Prashanth Isacc
 Narayan Payyannur
 Dileep Kozhikode
 Santra
 Ali Khan
 Ummar Khan
 Jibin Cacko
 Milan
 Deepu Ramasheri
 Swaminathan
 Prashanth Kottayam
 Master Niranjan
 Baby Leana
 Sainudeen
 Ansari
 Vasantharani

Soundtrack 
 "Mallikappoovinu"- Jaffer
 "Aanandamanu"- Vijay Yeshudas, Harsha
 "Koodozhinja paingili"- Vijay Yeshudas
 "Marakkuvanakilla"- Kannur Sherif
 "Nombarangal Kondu"- Vishnu Das
 "Pattu manam nonthu"- Kannur Sherif
 "Swarangalenn"- Vijay Yeshudas

References

External links

2017 films
2010s Malayalam-language films